Zhanbota Yerkinovna Aldabergenova (Janbota Erkinovna Aldabergenova; born ) is a Kazakh freestyle skier. She was born in Shymkent.  

She competed at the 2014 Winter Olympics, where she placed sixth in the women's aerials.

References

External links

1995 births
Living people
Olympic freestyle skiers of Kazakhstan
Freestyle skiers at the 2014 Winter Olympics
Freestyle skiers at the 2018 Winter Olympics
Freestyle skiers at the 2022 Winter Olympics
People from Shymkent
Kazakhstani female freestyle skiers
Universiade medalists in freestyle skiing
Universiade gold medalists for Kazakhstan
Universiade bronze medalists for Kazakhstan
Competitors at the 2017 Winter Universiade
Competitors at the 2019 Winter Universiade
21st-century Kazakhstani women